Azadlu Rural District is in Muran District of Germi County, Ardabil province, Iran. At the census of 2006, its population was 4,720 in 912 households; there were 4,197 inhabitants in 1,002 households at the following census of 2011; and in the most recent census of 2016, the population of the rural district was 3,855 in 1,181 households. The largest of its 24 villages was Parchin-e Sofla, with 532 people.

References 

Germi County

Rural Districts of Ardabil Province

Populated places in Ardabil Province

Populated places in Germi County